The Croydon East by-election  was held on 30 September 1954 after the death of the incumbent Conservative MP, Herbert Williams.  It was won by the Conservative candidate John Hughes-Hallett.

References

Croydon East,1954
Croydon East,1954
Croydon East,1954
Croydon East by-election
Croydon East by-election
Croydon East by-election
20th century in Surrey